The 1992 Marine Parade by-election was held on 19 December 1992. This by-election also marked the first (and the sole instance as of 2022) time in the history of Singapore, where an incumbent Prime Minister vacated his seat to face a by-election. (Lee Kuan Yew also vacated his seat in Tanjong Pagar to face a by-election in 1957, though he was the de facto opposition leader at the time.)

The People's Action Party (PAP) defeated the Singapore Democratic Party (SDP), the Singapore Justice Party (SJP) and the National Solidarity Party (NSP) with 72.9% of the vote. The team of candidates from the People's Action Party (PAP) were subsequently declared as the MPs for Marine Parade GRC.

Background
At the time of this by-election, both Deputy Prime Ministers, Ong Teng Cheong and Lee Hsien Loong, were suffering from cancer. Goh decided to hold a by-election in a safe constituency with the best chances of winning for “political self-renewal” to get people of “ministerial calibre” to join the government under PAP. While Goh, Othman bin Haron Eusofe and Matthias Yao were running again in the same constituency, Lim Chee Onn was replaced with Teo Chee Hean, the former chief of the Singapore navy, for the by-election.

At the 1991 general election, Goh promised to hold a by-election in 12 to 18 months’ time to allow J. B. Jeyaretnam, of the Workers’ Party, to contest a seat in parliament. Jeyaretnam was unable to contest in the 1991 general election due to a parliamentary ban which expired 2 months after the 1991 general election.

The by-election took place 11 years after the previous one, which at the time was the longest interval between by-elections. This would be surpassed by the 2012 Hougang by-election, that took place nearly two decades after this by-election.

Election deposit
The election deposit was set at $6000 per candidate. Similar to previous elections, the election deposit will be forfeited if the particular candidate had failed to secure at least 12.5% or one-eighth of the votes.

Results

See also
2020 Singaporean general election - another election where a multi-cornered contest occurred in a GRC (Pasir Ris-Punggol GRC between People's Action Party, Singapore Democratic Alliance and the new party, Peoples Voice)

References

1992
1992 elections in Asia
1992 in Singapore
December 1992 events in Asia